The Women's 75 kg weightlifting competitions at the 2016 Summer Olympics in Rio de Janeiro took place from 12 August at the Pavilion 2 of Riocentro.

Schedule
All times are Time in Brazil (UTC-03:00)

Records 
Prior to this competition, the existing world and Olympic records were as follows.

Results

References

Weightlifting at the 2016 Summer Olympics
Olymp
Women's events at the 2016 Summer Olympics